"Do for You" is a 1992 song recorded by Australian dance-pop trio Euphoria. The track was released in August 1992 and was the third single to feature on their debut studio album, Total Euphoria. The track peaked at number seven on the Australian ARIA Singles Chart, becoming their third and final top-10 single.

Track listing
Australian maxi-CD
 "Do for You" – 4:33
 "Baby, I Want It" (featuring Young MC) – 5:33
 "Love You Right" (Wilde De Coster Remix) – 5:58
 "I Want It" – 5:35

Charts

Weekly charts

Year-end charts

References

External links
Music Video for "Do for You" from YouTube

1992 singles
1992 songs
EMI Records singles
Euphoria (Australian band) songs
Songs written by Andrew Klippel